The Fuji T-3 is a primary military trainer aircraft used by the Japan Air Self Defense Force, manufactured by Fuji Heavy Industries. Its first flight was in 1978. In the course of its service life, 50 units were produced. It is being replaced by the Fuji T-7.

Development
The KM-2B was a further development of the Fuji KM-2 (itself a four-seat development of the T-34 Mentor with a more powerful engine) for use as a primary trainer for the Japan Air Self-Defense Force (JASDF).  It combined the structure and engine of the KM-2 with the tandem cockpit of the T-34 Mentor.  Its first flight was on 17 January 1978.  Fifty were purchased by the JASDF as the Fuji T-3, and production continued until 1982.

Operational history
The Fuji T-3 served with the 11 and 12 Hiko Kyoikudan (flying training wings) of the JASDF. It is currently being replaced with the Fuji T-7, a turboprop variant of the T-3  with a  Allison 250 engine.

Operators
 Japan Air Self-Defense Force

Specifications (T-3)

See also

References

1970s Japanese military trainer aircraft
Single-engined tractor aircraft
Low-wing aircraft
T-3
Aircraft first flown in 1978